John Paris is an American drummer, arranger, singer and songwriter. Paris is a member and drummer of the R&B, funk and jazz band Earth, Wind & Fire.

Biography
Paris appeared on Stephanie Mills' 1987 LP If I Was Your Woman. He later played the drums on Patti LaBelle's 1991 album Burnin', her 1992 LP Live! and  Waymon Tisdale's 1995 album Power Forward. He also worked with Bruce Hornsby on his 1995 LP Hot House, the Dazz Band on their 1997 album Double Exposure and played upon Mica Paris' 1998 album Black Angel. 

Paris has also played with artists such as Bob Dylan, Jimmy Cliff, Sheila E, Karyn White and Eric Benet.

In 2001, Paris became the drummer for the band, Earth, Wind & Fire.

Discography

Backing Musician and Production
1987 Stephanie Mills: If I Were Your Woman - (Drums)
1988 Jesse Johnson: Every Shade of Love - (Drums, Percussion's)
1991 Patti LaBelle: Burnin'- (Drums)
1992 Patti LaBelle: Live - (Drums)
1993 Walter & Scotty: My Brothers Keeper - (Arranger)
1994 Ricca: Ricca - (Drums)
1994 Philip Bailey: Philip Bailey (Co-producer and Drums)
1995 Wayman Tisdale: Power Forward - (Drums)
1996 Tracey Harris: Keep On Believin' - (Drums)
1998 Wayman Tisdale: Decisions - (Drums)
2001 Eddie M: Eddie M - (Producer, Drums, Writer, Keyboards)
2003 Earth, Wind & Fire: The Promise - (Drums)
2005 Earth, Wind & Fire: Illumination - (Drums)

References

1968 births
Living people
Earth, Wind & Fire members
African-American drummers
American funk drummers
American male drummers
Rhythm and blues drummers
20th-century American drummers